In mathematics, covering theorem can refer to
Besicovitch covering theorem
Jensen's covering theorem
Vitali covering lemma